Edith Reeves was an American silent film actress who also appeared on Broadway in the early 20th century.

Before her transition to motion pictures, Reeves was well known to American theater audiences. Aside from Broadway she performed in many houses showing high class vaudeville.
She was in the cast of Take My Advice in November 1911. The play was staged at the Fulton Theatre (Helen Hayes Theatre), 210 West 46th Street, in New York City. William Collier was the star player in this comedy in three acts staged under the management of Lew Fields. Reeves was with a company headed by William Lampe at the Empress Theatre in Los Angeles, California, in August 1914. James Gallagher was also in this melodrama, One Flight Up, which was written by Ivy Ashton Root.

The Lost Secret (1915) featured Reeves in her second screen appearance. Paul Gilmore and Daniel Gilfeather are in the cast. She teamed with Frank Mills and Howard Rickman in The Moral Fabric, a movie which debuted in March 1916. Reeves plays Amy Winthrop, a wife who is bored with her traditional husband. She becomes attracted to the theory of free love. The movie was produced by Thomas Ince. Her last film character is Ruth in The Song of the Soul (1918). The silent production stars Alice Joyce. Percy Standing, Barney Randall, Stephen Carr, and Walter McGrall play contributing roles. Tom Terriss is the director.

References

American stage actresses
American film actresses
American silent film actresses
Vaudeville performers
American Quakers
Year of death missing
Year of birth missing
20th-century American actresses